Gavriil Alexandrovich Ignatyev (1786 – 24 March 1852) was an Imperial Russian Army general of artillery who led the defence of the Babruysk fortress and the city of Babruysk from Napoleon's forces in 1812.

Honours and awards
 Order of St. Alexander Nevsky with diamonds
 Order of Saint Vladimir, 1st class
 Order of St. Anna, 1st class with diamond
 Order of St. George, 4th class
 Cross for Ishmael
 Badge "for L years irreproachable service"

1786 births
1852 deaths
Imperial Russian Army generals
Recipients of the Order of St. Vladimir, 1st class
Recipients of the Order of St. Anna, 1st class
Russian nobility